The Best of Free: All Right Now is a 1991 album by the band Free. All the tracks on this album were remixed by Bob Clearmountain. On 18 February 1991, the album was awarded a silver certification by the BPI, for UK album sales of over 60,000 units. The album entered the UK Albums Chart on 2 March 1991, it reached number 9 and stayed in the charts for 9 weeks.

Track listing
  "Wishing Well"
  "All Right Now"
  "Little Bit of Love"
  "Come Together in the Morning"
  "The Stealer"
  "Sail On"
  "Mr. Big"
  "My Brother Jake"
  "The Hunter"
  "Be My Friend"
  "Travellin' in Style"
  "Fire and Water"
  "Travelling Man"
  "Don't Say You Love Me"

References

Free (band) compilation albums
1991 greatest hits albums
Island Records compilation albums